Yenisey-2 may mean

 an imaging system used at the Luna 3 space craft
 the "second" team of Yenisey Krasnoyarsk Bandy Club